MV Caledonian Isles is one of the largest ships owned by Caledonian Maritime Assets Limited. She is operated by Caledonian MacBrayne (CalMac), which runs ferries to the Hebridean and Clyde Islands of Scotland. Caledonian Isles serves the Isle of Arran on the Ardrossan to Brodick route. As it is one of CalMac's busiest routes, Caledonian Isles has the largest passenger capacity in the fleet, and can carry up to 1000 passengers and 110 cars, with a crossing time of 55 minutes. She is used extensively by day-trippers to the Isle of Arran during the summer. 

When  enters service in 2023, Caledonian Isles is expected to become the second vessel on the Ardrossan-Brodick ferry crossing.

Layout
Modelled on the popular  of five years earlier, Caledonian Isles incorporates a fully enclosed car deck with watertight ramps at either end. When closed, the bow ramp seals the car deck and when open, forms the bridge between the ship and the linkspan. The car deck incorporates a set of mezzanine decks, one down each side of the central casing and each divided into three sections. These can be moved up and down to their deployed or stowed positions. When deployed, these allow additional cars to be loaded. If the mezzanine decks are fully deployed there is insufficient height to accommodate lorries and other high vehicles other than at the bow and stern. The central casing means that she can only carry one lane of commercial vehicles down each side of the car deck.
The passenger accommodation is similar to that onboard the Mull ship. Forward of the main entrance square is the cafeteria, with stairways leading up to the observation lounge and the outside deck. Aft of the entrance there are lounges down either side with toilet blocks, the shop and a bar lounge further towards the stern. The next deck up has the forward observation lounge at the bow and crew accommodation. An open deck extends right around the vessel on this level, including forward of the observation lounge and overlooking the bow. The upper deck has the bridge and outside seating from the huge red funnel towards the stern. Also on this level are the four enclosed lifeboats – 2 larger and 2 smaller boats mounted on davits. The 2 larger lifeboats were replaced in 2017 to make way for the new marine evacuation system.

Service
Caledonian Isles has only ever operated between Ardrossan and Brodick on Arran. She normally undertakes up to 5 crossings a day in each direction, leaving Ardrossan at 0700, 0945, 1230, 1515 and 1800, and leaving Brodick at 0820, 1105, 1355, 1640 and 1920. The 1920 Saturday departure was removed during the winter 2016/2017 timetable to facilitate a 0820 sailing from Brodick on Sunday, where a crew safety drill has been a normal occurrence since October 2016. 

During the period of the summer timetable there is an additional sailing on Friday evenings, leaving Ardrossan at 2030, returning from Brodick at 2140.

Due to the demand for capacity, a second ferry has supplemented Caledonian Isles during the summer season since 2005. This peak summer service originally operated between June and August however, due to demand, operates from May to September since 2013. During the summer 2012 period, the capacity was limited to 12 passengers for HGV drivers during the week, whilst a full passenger service was provided on Saturdays. From May to September 2013,  could carry its full capacity throughout the week, doubling the service to Arran from Monday to Wednesday. Isle of Arran undertook services from Ardrossan to Campbeltown on Thursday, Friday and Sunday, returning on Friday, Saturday (via Brodick) and Sunday, whilst still operating from Ardrossan to Arran outwith its Campbeltown sailings.

On first coming into service, Caledonian Isles usually berthed overnight at Ardrossan in the summer and at Brodick in the winter timetable. Now, she usually berths overnight at Ardrossan all year. During periods of adverse weather, it is not uncommon for the vessel to berth overnight at Brodick, with either cancellation of the 1920 service from Brodick, or a return to Brodick after the 1920 eastbound sailing. The 0700 sailing from Ardrossan the following morning is then cancelled. During adverse weather conditions, Caledonian Isles has been diverted to Gourock. This happened on 4 January 2012, following storm damage to the linkspan at Ardrossan.

In February 2012, Caledonian Isles was in dry-dock to repair damage sustained in a collision with Winton Pier, Ardrossan. She was relieved by Isle of Arran which was often diverted to Wemyss Bay and Gourock. In February 2014,  once again relieved Caledonian Isles after she broke down. In April 2015,  had problems with her prop shaft which delayed the introduction of her additional Arran summer sailings, leaving Caledonian Isles to carry all the traffic and run additional sailings at night.

In August 2015, it was announced that two new ferries would be built at Ferguson Marine Engineering at Port Glasgow on the Clyde. The much delayed  is expected to serve Arran from 2022, replacing  and allowing Caledonian Isles to become the second ferry on the Ardrossan-Brodick and the Ardrossan-Campbeltown crossings.

Before heading to Birkenhead for her overhaul in January 2018, she called at Campbeltown to test the berth. The last sailing from the old Brodick pier was the 0820 to Ardrossan on Tuesday 20 March 2018. Caledonian Isles started operating from the new Brodick ferry terminal later that day. The new terminal has two ferry berths: the west side berth and the east side berth.

On 16 March 2019 Caledonian Isles rammed the pier at Brodick after her bow thrusters failed, causing significant damage to her bow visor. During her repairs,  took up service on the Arran crossing, while  operated a shuttle service from Claonaig to Lochranza to clear the backlog of traffic unable to board the smaller Hebridean Isles at Ardrossan.

In October 2019, Caledonian Isles was diverted to Troon as the linkspans in both Ardrossan and Gourock - the vessel's usual port of diversion - failed, resulting in vehicles being unable to board or alight from the ferry there. During this period,  operated additional services from Claonaig to Lochranza. Bad weather prevented Caledonian Isles from berthing in Troon, reducing the service to passenger-only from Ardrossan. 

During her annual overhaul in 2022, unexpected steelworks were required, delaying the vessel's return to service.

In April 2022, Caledonian Isles suffered a port engine failure and struck the breakwater. She was removed from service and relieved by Isle of Arran, with Loch Riddon providing additional capacity on the Lochranza - Claonaig route alongside Catriona. This caused significant disruption to the Arran service, with all vehicle bookings cancelled and a significant reduction in capacity. On Friday 22nd April, CalMac announced that Caledonian Isles would remain out of service for at least three weeks whilst undergoing repairs in Troon. 

Caledonian Isles departed for annual overhaul in early January 2023. Initially scheduled to return to service on 2nd February, she experienced significant delays during overhaul due to additional steel work and engine repairs being required. CalMac initially announced a provisional return date of 28th February, but this was later pushed back to 31st March. During Caledonian Isles absence, she was relieved by Isle of Arran. Hebridean Isles was scheduled to operate alongside Isle of Arran, however significant technical faults saw her providing a freight-only service between Brodick and Troon, before being withdrawn from service altogether in late February.

References

External links

MV Caledonian Isles on www.calmac.co.uk

Caledonian MacBrayne
1993 ships